Water supply and sanitation in Yemen is characterized by many challenges as well as some achievements. A key challenge is severe water scarcity, especially in the Highlands, prompting The Times of London to write "Yemen could become the first nation to run out of water". A second key challenge is a high level of poverty, making it very difficult to recover the costs of service provision. Access to water supply sanitation in Yemen is as low or even lower than that in many sub-Saharan African countries. Yemen is both the poorest country and the most water-scarce country in the Arab world. Third, the capacity of sector institutions to plan, build, operate and maintain infrastructure remains limited. Last but not least the security situation makes it even more difficult to improve or even maintain existing levels of service.

The average Yemeni has access to only 140 cubic meters of water per year (101 gallons per day) for all uses, while the Middle Eastern average is 1,000 m3/yr, and the internationally defined threshold for water stress is 1,700 cubic meters per year. Yemen's groundwater is the main source of water in the country but the water tables have dropped severely leaving the country without a viable source of water. For example, in Sana'a, the water table was 30 meters below surface in the 1970s but had dropped to 1200 meters below surface by 2012 in some areas. The groundwater has not been regulated by Yemen's governments. Even before the revolution, Yemen's water situation had been described as increasingly dire by experts who worried that Yemen would be the "first country to run out of water". Agriculture in Yemen takes up about 90% of water in Yemen even though it only generates 6% of GDP - however a large portion of Yemenis are dependent on small-scale subsistence agriculture. Half of agricultural water in Yemen is used to grow khat, a narcotic that most Yemenis chew. This means that in such a water-scarce country as Yemen, where half the population is food-insecure, 45% of the water withdrawn from the ever-depleting aquifers is used to grow a narcotic that does not feed Yemenis.

Due to the 2015 Yemeni Civil War, the situation is increasingly dire. 80% of the country's population struggles to access water to drink and bathe. Bombing has forced many Yemenis to leave their homes for other areas, and so wells in those areas are under increasing pressure. In addition, water infrastructure itself has been targeted by warplanes. For example, on January 8, 2016, a major desalination plant in the city of Mokha was destroyed by a Saudi bomb, which caused the disruption of water supply not of Mokha but also of Ta'iz. In addition to the impacts of the war, global warming and human overpopulation have also contributed to the destruction of Yemen's water supply. As of June 2017, Yemen is facing the world's worst outbreak of cholera, caused by lack of clean drinking water. Over 2000 people died from the highly contagious bacterial infection in the four months from April to August 2017.

Access 
In 2014, around 11.2 million people lacked access to "improved" water and around 11.5 million people were without access to "improved" sanitation in Yemen.

Previously, in 2012, 55% of the total population  had access to "improved" water, or 72% of the urban population and 47% of the rural population. Regarding sanitation, in 2012, 53% of the total population had access to "improved"  sanitation, or 93% of the urban population and 34% of the rural population.

Running water is available in many parts of the country, but most villages remain without it. Women in remote areas typically draw water from the nearest well or from a cistern, sometimes walking up to two hours each way twice a day. They may carry the water in pots on their heads or load them onto donkeys.

Statistics on access to water supply and sanitation in Yemen are contradictory. For example, the data from the latest census, carried out in 1997, are very different from data in a Demographic and Health Survey (DHS) carried out in the same year. According to the census, 61% or urban households had access to water connections in their home, while according to the DHS the same figure was 70%, but for rural areas the order is reversed. The census gives higher figures for access to house connections (25%) than the DHS (19%). The latest data used by the United Nations are from the 2004 Family and Health Survey and the 2006 Multiple Indicator Cluster Survey. Estimates for 2011 are made based on an extrapolation of trends from previous years.

In 2011, the United Nations' Joint Monitoring Programme for Water Supply and Sanitation estimated that only 55% of the Yemeni population had access to improved water source – including 40% from house connections and 15% from other improved water sources such as standpipes. Only 53% had access to improved sanitation. Access to improved water supply, using a broad definition of access, is estimated to be much higher in urban areas than in rural areas (72% vs. 47%). The urban-rural gap is much higher for improved sanitation (93% vs. 33%). Due to rapid population growth, access to water supply actually declined in relative terms from 66% in 1990 to 55% in 2011 despite a substantial increase in absolute access. However, access to improved sanitation increased from 24% to 53% during the same period, according to the estimates.

Service quality
Service quality for water supply and sanitation has many dimensions. For example, service quality for water supply can be measured through the continuity of supply, which is generally low in Yemen, and customer satisfaction, which is surprisingly high. One indicator for the service quality of sanitation is the effectiveness of wastewater treatment plants at removing pollutants, which is often low in Yemen.

Continuity of water supply

Continuity of water supply is poor in most Yemeni cities. For example, in Taiz, the frequency of the public piped water delivery is only once about every 40 days. More and more people have to rely on more costly water provided by private wells supplying water tankers. The quality of this water is questionable because these tankers have often been used for other purposes without appropriate cleaning. According to the Ministry of Water and Environment, 15 of 23 urban water utilities provided water every day for between 12 and 24 hours in 2007. These data do not differentiate between utilities with continuous supply and those with intermittent supply of a “moderate” sort (more than 12 hours daily water supply). The 15 cities thus include Sana’a and Aden that provide intermittent water supply. Four other towns provided water on a daily basis, but less than 12 hours per day. The city of Ibb and the town of Bajil provide water only once a week. And the utilities in Taiz and Mahwit provided water only less than once a week in 2007. However, there are potentially conflicting reports about the continuity of supply. For example, the Ministry reported that water was being provided on a daily basis in Amran in 2007. However, 100% of the respondents to a household survey in the same town in 2008 indicated that they received water only once a week or even once a month.

Customer satisfaction
According to a survey carried out in 2008 in 7 towns 88% of the customers of water utilities said they were satisfied with the service level of their water utility, and only 9% were dissatisfied. Even in the city of Ibb, where water supply is intermittent, 47% of customers declared they were satisfied. In the town of Amran, where the situation was similar, even more customers - 74% - were satisfied. It may be that customers have become accustomed to poor service quality and have correspondingly lowered their expectations. 77% of households said that they drank tap water.

Wastewater treatment
Yemen has more than 17 urban and more than 15 rural wastewater treatment plants. They use the following technologies:
 Activated sludge in Sana'a and Ibb (2)
 Imhoff tanks or trickling filters in Hajjah (1)
 Imhoff tanks followed by stabilization ponds in Zabid (1)
 Septic tanks followed by stabilization ponds in Al Mahwait (1)
 Stabilization ponds in Aden, al-Hodeidah, Bajil, Thamr, Yarim, Al Bayda, Radaa, 'Amran, Bayt Al-Faqih (9) and other cities or towns.

According to a 2002 report by staff from the Yemeni Environment Protection Agency, there were also wastewater treatment plants in Taiz, Dammar, Yarem, and Radaa. Most of the plants use the stabilization pond technology. The largest wastewater treatment plant in the country, located in Sana'a, was completed in 2000, but it had to be upgraded between 2003 and 2005 due to "deficiencies in its operation, unacceptable odor emissions, and inadequate management of the generated sludge". While data on the quality of treated effluent are limited, available data show that the effluent of at least two plants complied with the relatively lenient national standard of 150 mg/L of Biological oxygen demand, a measure of organic pollution. However, none of the four analyzed plants complied with the standard for fecal coliform, a measure of biological contamination. Reuse of treated and untreated wastewater in agriculture is common in Yemen. Wastewater from hospitals and medical laboratories is discharged into the sewer system, but cannot be adequately treated in the existing municipal wastewater treatment plants.

Water resources

With renewable water resources of only 125 cubic meters per capita/year Yemen is one of the most water-scarce countries in the world. This level is less than one tenth of the threshold for water stress, which is defined at 1,700 cubic meters per capita/year. Total water demand of 3,400 million cubic metres per year exceeds renewable resources of 2,500 million cubic metres per year, thus leading to a steady decline in groundwater levels, varying between 1 m per year in the Tuban-Abyan area and 6–8 m per year in the Sana’a basin. Today, there are between 45,000 and 70,000 wells in Yemen, the majority of which are under private control. No one can be certain of the exact number, as almost all were drilled without license. Agriculture takes the lion's share of Yemen's water resources, sucking up almost 90 percent, and it is estimated that khat production accounts for 37 percent of all water used in irrigation.

Furthermore, climate change has apparently led to a reduction in the level of rainfall. For example, in Sana'a the average rainfall has declined by one sixth from 240mm (average 1932–1968) to 200mm (1969–1982) and 180mm (1983–2000).

Sana'a
Sana'a could be the first capital city in the world to run dry. The combined output of the 125 wells operated by the state-owned Sana'a Local Corporation for Water Supply and Sanitation barely meets 35 percent of the growing city's need. The rest is supplied either by small, privately owned networks or by hundreds of mobile tankers. In recent years, as water quality has deteriorated, privately owned kiosks that use reverse osmosis to purify poor-quality groundwater supplies have mushroomed in Sana'a and other towns. The enormous pumping cost would push the price of water up to $10 per cubic meter.

The Minister for Water and the Environment, Abdulrahman al-Eryani, said in 2007:

Other localities
"Along the coast between Mukalla and Aden a number of fishing villages are supplied by water within a half mile of the shore. The water levels are a few feet above mean sea level and probably represent wedges of freshwater floating on sea water (Ghyben-Herzberg principle). The freshwater probably originated from the higher ground behind the coastal plains by slow seaward movement, and partly from natural precipitation."

Groundwater near the city of Ibb is polluted by leachate from a landfill.

History and recent events

Sector reforms (1995–2008)
The water and sanitation sector has undergone important changes between 1995 and 2008, with most significant changes occurring between 2000 and 2003. Decentralization, commercialization and community participation were key principles of these reforms. In 2003 the Ministry of Water and Environment (MWE) was created, taking over responsibility for water supply and sanitation from the former the Ministry of Energy and Water (MEW). This was seen a sign of political commitment to tackle the challenges Yemen faces in the water sector. In 2005 a National Water Sector Strategy and Investment Program was adopted. One result has been closer cooperation between the Ministries of Water and Agriculture, as well as between donors. Through the process of joint annual reviews these ministries, their agencies and donors evaluate progress. The changes affect urban water supply and sanitation, rural water supply and sanitation, as well as water resources management.

Despite these challenges, achievements were achieved in the sector around the turn of the millennium when wide-ranging reforms were carried out, flanked by substantial donor support. Through the reforms urban service provision was decentralized to commercially run local corporations. The utilities substantially increased tariffs, despite the political sensitivity of the topic in a poor country, and managed to increase cost recovery. Despite these increases water remains affordable with the average share of total monthly household expenditure on water and sewerage at about 1.1% of total expenditures. The average monthly expenditure on the widely used stimulant qat is about eight times the amount paid for the water and sewer bill. Between 1995 and 2008, 2.8 million people in Yemen gained access to an improved water source and 7.5 million to improved sanitation. According to a survey carried out in 2008 in 7 towns, 89% of the customers of water utilities said they were satisfied with the service level of their water utility, and only 9% were dissatisfied. In Sana'a, the collection efficiency of water and sewer bills increased from 60% to 97% during the same period. However, it declined again to 60% in 2011.

The main external donors involved in the water and sanitation sector in Yemen are Germany, the World Bank and the Netherlands.

Urban water supply and sanitation
Until 2000 urban water and sewer services were provided by a national public enterprise called the National Water and Sanitation Authority (NWSA). According to a study of the reform process, before the reform tariffs were set by the national government at levels insufficient to meet operating costs, the revenues were centrally controlled, civil service salaries were too low to motivate staff; local branches were dependent on headquarters for hiring and firing staff; budgets allocated to branches were inadequate; and centralized procedures and management systems were inadequate to run the branches on a more efficient cost recovery basis.

A World Bank-funded study, which would become the blueprint of the reform process, was conducted by John Kalbermatten during 1995–1996. The study recommended that the urban water and sanitation sector should be decentralized, corporatized and commercialized through the creation of local corporations that would take over service provision from the national utility NWSA. In addition, the private sector was to take a major role in service provision and an autonomous regulatory agency was to be created. This became national policy in 1997.

A small branch of the national utility NWSA in Rada'a in the Al Bayda' Governorate was selected to be a pilot to test the decentralized, commercial approach. The principles on which the reform were based became thus known as the Rada'a. They are as follows:
 The Branch will operate independently of NWSA Head Office while remaining accountable to NWSA on regulatory matters and to the Minister of Electricity and Water on policy issues.
 The Branch will be accountable to the community it serves through a Local Advisory Committee which will monitor and review the Branch's activities.
 The Branch will set its own local tariff and billing system, and retain revenues in its own bank accounts, while paying an overhead contribution for regulatory services.
 The Branch will appoint its own staff, except for the three main management posts which will be via Ministerial resolution on agreed criteria.
 The Branch will apply a staff incentive scheme based on actual performance to supplement staff remuneration according to civil service standards.
 The Branch will prepare monthly operational reports and quarterly and annual statements of account
 The Branch will have its accounts audited by a private auditor.

In 2000 the Local Administration Law No. 4 was passed, providing an impetus to decentralization. The first local corporation was created in the Sana'a region in February 2000, followed by Aden in the same year. Five more local corporations were established in 2001 in Taiz, Hodeida, Ibb, Wadi Hadramaut and Mukalla. Two more (Hajjah and Al-Bayda') were established in 2005, four (Sadah, Abyan, Lahj and Dhamar) in 2006, and 2 further (Amran and Ad Dali') in 2008. As of 2009 more than 95% of urban areas were served by 15 local corporations. In 2003, the newly created Ministry of Water and Environment introduced a Performance Indicators Information System (PIIS) to monitor and evaluate the performance of the urban water and sanitation service providers at the local and national levels. A regulation study was completed in 2006. On its basis a bill was prepared to establish an independent regulatory agency, but it has not been adopted so far.

According to the Yemen Observer, "the process of decentralization was not smooth; it faced strong resistance from the central organization. Sustainable political will and endorsement of the local administration law helped to overcome these obstacles".

The autonomy of the local corporations, however, remained limited. Important decisions such as the approval of tariff increases, investment decisions, and the selection of the General Manager of each Local Corporation still required the approval of the central government. Investments are financed by foreign grants channeled through the central government. Furthermore, the Boards of the local corporations often did not play an active role. For example, in Ibb the Board met infrequently, did not discuss the corporation's accounts and was reluctant to even discuss a tariff increase. In 2009 a study recommended to transform local corporations into public companies with clear business plans and more autonomy, but this recommendation was not implemented.

Rural water supply and sanitation
Concerning rural water supply and sanitation, in a Cabinet Decree (Decree #21 of November 22, 2000) the government ratified a Policy Statement, emphasizing the principles demand-responsiveness, decentralized community-based management and cost recovery. The General Authority for Rural Electricity and Water (GAREW) was responsible for promoting rural water supply and electrification at that time. In 2003 GAREW was also separated along sector lines and the GARWSP created for water supply.

Water Resources Management: 2002 Water Law
In July 2002 Law No. 33 of 2002 was passed. It deals with water resources management, not with drinking water supply and sanitation. However, it provides a framework to preserve water resources that are essential for the sustainability of water services. An Arabic copy is available on the Yemeni Public Prosecutor's website, together with a copy of the Environment Law No. 26 of 1995. The context of the water law is described as follows:

National water conservation campaign (2008)
In 2008 NWRA launched a national water conservation campaign in partnership with the German development organisation GTZ and the United Nations Development Programme. The campaign's figurehead was a cartoon character in the shape of a raindrop. His name - Rowyan - means "I've had enough water" in Arabic.

Impact of the crisis since 2009
Since 2009 the security situation in Yemen began to deteriorate, resulting in heavy fighting in different parts of the country and a change of government in 2011. The fighting has forced many people to flee their homes, such as tens of thousands of people who fled from Abyan to Lahej and who received emergency drinking water supplies from the international community. Urban water supply throughout the country was affected by the interruption of power supply, lack of diesel fuel, insufficient backup generators, and a decline in revenues due to reluctance of consumers to pay their bills. In January 2012 the Minister of Water, Abdulsalam Razaz, said that the Ministry was owed over YR 33 billion (US$153 million) "by government bodies and people of power” and warned that it was "on the verge of bankruptcy". In addition, strikes caused chaos in the Ministry and its branches.

In 2010, the General Rural Water Authority (GRWA) commissioned an assessment of existing rural water coverage. It recommended to focus on rainwater harvesting in Yemen's highlands, and on well drilling in the coastal and desert areas. But the ensuing political chaos prevented implementation of the recommendations. According to international aid organisations, the government of President Abd Rabbuh Mansur Hadi has put little energy towards resolving the water crisis and "water was at the bottom of the list" of its priorities.

Civil War
Yemen's water situation has deteriorated significantly since the start of the civil war in 2015. The blockade has prevented Yemenis from importing fuel, which is necessary to pump groundwater.  20 million people are now in need of water and sanitation, a 52% increase since before the Saudi Arabian-led intervention in Yemen started, and the price of water has increased so much that some families spend a third of their income on water. Since the normal means of supplying and storing water have been severely damaged by the bombing, Yemenis have resorted to collecting water in buckets when it rains. The situation has led to the spread of disease, including dengue and malaria.

Devastation of Yemeni infrastructure, health, water and sanitation systems and facilities by Saudi-led coalition air strikes led to the spread of cholera.

Saudi-led coalition airstrikes are deliberately targeting water systems in Yemen.

Responsibility for water supply and sanitation

Policy and regulation
The Ministry of Water and Environment (MWE) is in charge of formulating water policies in Yemen. In the field of water supply and sanitation it is supported by a Technical Secretariat (TS) for Water Sector Reform. The government envisages to create an autonomous regulatory agency for the water and sanitation sector.

Four agencies report to the Ministry: The National Water Resources Authority (NWRA) for water resources management, the National Water and Sewerage Authority (NWSA) for urban water supply, the General Authority for Rural Water Supply (GARWSP) for rural water supply, and the Environment Protection Agency (EPA).

The National Water and Sewerage Authority (NWSA) provides technical assistance, establishes sector standards, organizes and implements training programs and establishes data bases for all local corporations until the establishment of a regulatory agency. In addition, it still provides water and sewer services in some urban areas.

The National Water Resources Authority (NWRA) has the mission to manage the nation's water resources on a sustainable basis, to ensure satisfaction of basic water needs by all but especially by the poor, and to establish a system of water allocation that is fair, yet flexible for meeting varying needs of economically and demographically dynamic sectors. NWRA has branches in Sana'a, Taiz, Sa'dah, Aden, Hadramaut and Hodeida.

The General Authority for Rural Water Supply (GARWSP) provides support to water user associations in rural areas.

Service provision

Urban areas

As of October 2008, 15 Local Corporations (LCs), 13 autonomous public utilities, as well as 16 local branches of NWSA provide services in urban areas.

Local corporations provide services in the largest cities of the country: Aden, Al-Hodeidah, Ibb, Mukalla, Sana'a and Taiz. They also provide services in 9 towns:  Abyan, Amran, Al-Bayda', Ad Dali', Dhamar, Hajjah, Lahj, Sadah and Wadi Hadramaut. They thus serve the great majority of the urban population of Yemen. 15 of the 21 governorates of Yemen have a LC and the objective is to have one LC per governorate.

Autonomous public utilities are typically affiliated to the local corporation in their governorate. They are cost centers within the LC. For example, the autonomous utility in Bait al-Faqih reports to the local corporation in Hodeidah, and the autonomous utility in Rada'a, where the reform process had been piloted, reports to the local corporation in Al/Bayda'. Two of the 15 autonomous utilities are still affiliated to NWSA. These two utilities—in Ataq, the capital of Shabwah Governorate, and in Al Mahwit—are located in governorates where there is no local corporation yet. They are in an intermediate state before becoming LCs. The Rada’a Principles apply to all autonomous public utilities.

The local branches of NWSA include the smaller capital cities of governorates where there is neither  a local corporation nor an autonomous utility yet. They include Ma'rib, Al Jawf and Al Mahrah as well as the newly created governorate Raymah. It is estimated that less than 5% of the urban population of Yemen live in the 16 local branches that remain with NWSA.

Rural areas

Services in rural areas are provided by thousands of community-based water committees. According to a 2000 World Bank report, at that time communities were insufficiently involved in water system design and government and donor-supported schemes usually fell short of developing effective community construction and management mechanisms. Water committees were imposed local institutions, often suffering from internal management conflicts, leading to negligence of operation and maintenance which resulted in frequent break-downs. More than 50 percent of systems were broken down. Systems were often over-designed, and users can not afford paying the full cost of operating the schemes, let alone producing an operating surplus for the purchase of spare parts and major repairs. In addition, political and tribal leaders frequently demanded that the government allocates its resources to particular projects, thereby interrupting—even abandoning—the work of started schemes. According to a 1996 Review, there were several hundreds of incomplete projects at that time. Little was done in the area of hygiene education, safe drinking water storage, and wastewater and excreta disposal.

Most of the projects require some "contribution" of the beneficiaries, for example, an up-front down-payment towards investment costs (varying between 5 percent and 30 percent).

In 2007 the World Bank reported that a “Demand Responsive Approach (DRA) has been mainstreamed into all sub-sector interventions throughout the country and is used in all governorates”. Furthermore, a rural water strategy has been finalized, agreed upon by all stakeholders and awaited cabinet approval in early 2008.

Efficiency
In 2011 the level of non-revenue water was estimated to be 32% in Sana'a, 33% in Aden, 22% in Taiz and 35% in Mukalla. This is an improvement compared to previous levels. In 2001 non-revenue water was estimated to be around 50 percent. According to the joint annual review of the water and sanitation sector for 2007, average non-revenue water was down to 28%. In Sana'a non-revenue water had declined from about 50% in 1999 to an estimated 38% in 2007. In 2007, among the larger utilities the lowest level was achieved in Ibb with 20% and the highest in Hodeidah with 43%. The authors of the report caution that the data quality may be poor.

All utilities suffer from overstaffing, but continue to recruit staff. The number of staff per 1,000 connections was 10 in 2000, while a level of less than five is considered as typical for an efficient utility. In 2007, the number of staff per 1,000 connections varied between 5 and 20.

Financial aspects
Financial aspects of water and sanitation cover the financial sustainability of the entities that provide piped water supply and sanitation services, as well as the affordability of these services to households. Household expenditures for water include payments for water bought from private tanker trucks as well as the payment of bills for piped water.

Urban areas
Cost recovery. The accepted norm for cost recovery by the entities in charge of urban water supply and sanitation in Yemen is for the tariff to be set such that the operation and maintenance costs are recovered at the least, with the government and donors financing investments. However, in some cases, such as Sana’a, credits by international donors are on-lent to the utility. A few utilities have been able to achieve full cost recovery. One example is the small town Bait al Faqih which has a new system and low losses, indicating a functional and efficient network, and no inherited staff and thus no overstaffing. Collection efficiency, the share of bills actually paid, increased from 60% in 1999 to 97% in 2007. However, in 2011 it declined again to about 60%.

Tariff structure. Municipal water tariffs in Yemen are differentiated based on three customer categories: domestic users pay the least, while commercial users as well as government entities pay more. All utilities use increasing-block tariffs, with the lowest block covering a consumption between 5 and 10 cubic meters per month and connection.

Tariff adjustments. The government has shown a willingness to raise tariffs, having done so in 1995, 1998, 1999 and 2001. Further increases have been undertaken subsequently by local corporations. From 1995-2001 the monthly bill increased over 350% for a domestic customer consuming 15 m³/month, and the industrial tariff increased over 150 percent per m3.

Affordability. As a result of the collapse of state institutions after war broke out, even more households than before have to rely on water bought from tanker trucks, who in turn buy water from well owners. According to the World Bank, in 2018, the cost of water supplied by tankers cost seven times the price of municipally supplied water in Sana’a. In Aden untreated water costs 25 times as much or USD 7.30 per cubic meter. Treated, desalinated water costs as much as 20 USD per cubic meter. The war-induced fuel crisis has driven up the price of gasoline, which made it more expensive to pump, transport and treat water. Prior to the war, the share of the water bill for 5 cubic meter per month and household was between 0.5% and 1.1% of income of poor households for the 11 largest utilities in 2007. The share of the sewer bill was between zero and 0.7%. Water and sewer bills were thus highly affordable. The highest combined share of water and sewer bill was found in Sana'a with 1.6%. The average share of total monthly household expenditure on water and sewerage was about 1.1%, which amounted to about YR 1,363, while the average monthly expenditure on qat was about eight times (YR 10,888) the amount paid for water, according to the household budget survey (2005–2006).

Rural areas
In 2000 the majority of rural water systems used some form of cost-recovery, either based on metered water use, or a flat rate.

External cooperation
Prior to the war, the main donors for the water and sanitation sector were the World Bank, the Arab Fund for Economic and Social Development , the German Development Bank KfW, the German Technical Cooperation agency GIZ and the Netherlands. Other important donors included Japan, UNDP, DFID and the European Union. Since the outbreak of the war, agencies specialized on assistance during conflicts such as UNICEF have gained importance.

UNICEF
UNICEF and its local partners provide water through trucks, water points and communal water tanks to internally displaced people. They also construct emergency latrines and distribute hygiene kits and tablets for water treatment. In urban areas, they provide fuel, spare parts and chlorine. They also help  rehabilitate sewage systems. Together with GARWSP it installated 29 rural solar-powered water schemes in 2018. 750 Rapid Response Teams intervened in 259 of Yemen's 333 distrcits whenever cholera cases were suspected by desludging and fixing damaged water and sewage pipes. This has significantly reduced the cholera cases in the affected districts.

World Bank
An Urban Water Supply and Sanitation Program Project supported by a US$150 million World Bank credit, approved in August 2002, aims at efficient and sustainable water and sanitation services in major urban areas. Their project has three components. The first rehabilitates and expands the water supply and sanitation infrastructure. The second component supports institutional restructuring and improving managerial capacities of local corporations; and to put in place an appropriate structure for a regulatory body for the urban water and sanitation sector in Yemen. A Rural Water Supply and Sanitation Project—with US$20 million approved in December 2000 and additional financing of US$20 million approved in January 2008—aims to expand sustainable rural water supply and sanitation service coverage to mostly poor rural dwellers in ten governorates. Until 2007, 140 water sub-projects serving a population of 320,000 were completed. In addition, three consecutive Social fund for Development Projects financed partly by the World Bank allocated an estimated 15% for rural water supply and sanitation.

Arab Fund for Economic and Social Development (AFESD)
The Arab Fund for Economic and Social Development (AFESD), a regional Arab funding institution, has financed several water and sanitation projects in Yemen. Examples are: the construction of the  Sanaa' wastewater treatment plant (with a soft loan of around $30 million); the construction of  wastewater networks in Sanaa' (first and second phase)(with two soft loans of around $100 million); the expansion of the Sanaa' wastewater treatment plant; the improvement of water and sanitation facilities in Aden (with a soft loan of around US$35 million); the construction of wastewater facilities in Seiyun and Tareem (with a soft loan of around US$50 million); and the Sanaa' Flood protection project (with a soft loan of around US$25 million). In November 2012, Arab Fund signed an agreement to finance the fourth phase of Sanaa' wastewater networks with a soft loan of about US$54 million. The construction will be completed before the end of 2017. In 2014, the Arab Fund signed an agreement to finance additional works in Sanaa' flood protection, with a soft loan of around US$35 million. In addition, AFESD provided several grants for the water and sanitation sector in Yemen. Examples are preparing wastewater study for old Sanaa' city, construction of a septage disposal facility in Sanaa'.

Germany
Germany has played an important role in the implementation of urban water and sanitation reforms in Yemen since the mid-1990s, including through the support provided by GTZ to the technical secretariat in the Ministry in charge of the sector. GTZ supports the water and sanitation sector through a €23 million program for the Institutional Development of the Water Sector from 1994 to 2009. The program supports the decentralization reforms, strengthens local corporations, and establishes water basin committees and water resources management plans through training provided by NWSA and NWRA.

On behalf of the German government KfW development bank provides financing for water and sanitation investments in the city of Aden as well as in the towns of Al Shehr/Al Hami in Mukalla District, Mokha, Yarim, Amran, Sa'dah, Zabid, Bajil, Mansouria and Beit al-Faqih, the latter four being located in the Al Hudaydah Governorate. An evaluation of an earlier project for the renewal and expansion of drinking water supply systems in eight provincial towns in Yemen (Bajil, Bait al Faqih, Al Mansouria, Zabid, Mokha, Amran, Yarim und Hajjah), and sanitation measures in three towns (Hajjah, Amran and Yarim) showed that the project largely achieved its objectives related to water supply. The quality of the construction work was rated as high and the collection of bills was considered to be "efficient". However, in Yarim the objective was not achieved due to water shortages. Only "modest improvements" were achieved regarding waste water disposal. Another project to reduce water losses in Taiz and Mukalla was considered a partial failure: On the positive side, the evaluation showed that losses in the rehabilitated areas were reduced significantly. In Mukalla, where 40% of the network was rehabilitated, they were reduced from 22% to 8%. In Taiz, where only 12% of the network was rehabilitated, they fell from 45% to 6%. However, overall losses in the cities remained high at 30% in Mukalla and 47% in Taiz, because only parts of the network were rehabilitated. The cost of the measures was higher than expected due to the poorer than expected state of the network. KfW is now in the process of applying robust, quantitative-based evaluation methods to more accurately assess the health impact of the interventions it supported in Yemeni towns based. This will be done through surveys including both beneficiaries and a control group.

Netherlands
The Netherlands have a long development assistance history in the Water Sector of Yemen (since 1978). Considerable amounts of funds have been used for urban and rural infrastructure projects in water and sanitation, irrigation, water resources assessment and management, but also for capacity development and organisational and institutional strengthening as well as Water Sector Reform.

Until the late nineties the assistance mainly consisted of projects, the slowly shifting to a program approach. Between 2006 and 2009, around €5 million per year is available for the water sector. Rural Water Supply and Water Resources Management will continue to be the main areas to which funds will be made available.

In February 2006, the Netherlands Minister for Development Cooperation at the time, during her visit to Yemen, signed a Public-Private Partnership (PPP) declaration between three partners:
 the Ta’iz Water Supply and Sanitation Local Corporation
 Vitens N.V. the largest drinking water supply company in the Netherlands
 the Netherlands Ministry for Development Cooperation.
The PPP will implement a three-year utility support program to improve the management and service delivery of the Ta’iz corporation. The PPP implementation costs a total amount of €1.5 million.

Japan
Japan International Cooperation Agency focuses its cooperation on rural water supply, building and rehabilitating water supply facilities in 20 remote villages in five governorates, including Sana'a, Ibb and Taiz.

See also

Hot stain
Peak water
Water crisis

References

Bibliography
 Greenwood, J.E.G.W. and D. Bleackley. 1967. “Geology of the Arabian Peninsula- Aden Protectorate.” Washington, DC: US Geological Survey Professional Paper 560-C.
 Hadden, Robert Lee. 2012. The Geology of Yemen: An Annotated Bibliography of Yemen's Geology, Geography and Earth Science. Alexandria, VA: US Army Corps of Engineers, Army Geospatial Center.
 Richards, Tony. 2002. “Assessment of Yemen Water Law: Final Report.” Prepared for: Deutsche Gesellschaft fuer Technische Zusammenarbeit (GTZ) GmbH. Page 1.
 Mark Zeitoun, Tony Allan, Nasser Al Aulaqi, Amer Jabarin and Hammou Laamrani:Water demand management in Yemen and Jordan: addressing power and interests, The Geographical Journal, Vol. 178, No. 1, March 2012, pp. 54–66.

External links
 Yemenwater, hosted by the Yemen Water Partnership
 Yemeni-German Technical Cooperation - Water Sector Program
 Caton, Steven C.:Anthropology, Harvard University: Yemen, Water and the Politics of Knowledge, 2007
 Sustaining Water for All in a Changing Climate - The World Bank, 2010, Special case study on water resources in Yemen, pgs. 87-90.

 
Environment of Yemen
Health in Yemen
Decentralization